Kalbali (also Romanized as Kalb‘alī; also known as Kalbī and Kalvī) is a village in Sakhvid Rural District, Nir District, Taft County, Yazd Province, Iran. At the 2006 census, its population was 33, in 11 families.

References 

Populated places in Taft County